The Landskapsregering is the government of Åland, an autonomous region of Finland. The government is led by a Lantråd, the premier of Åland, who is elected by the Lagting, the parliament of Åland.

List of Premiers of Åland (since 1922)

Government 
Government member parties since 2019: Åland Centre Party, Moderate Coalition for Åland, Non-aligned Coalition and the Sustainable Initiative.

2015 to 2019 
Government member parties: Liberals for Åland (Lib), Åland Social Democrats (S) and Moderate Coalition for Åland (M):

Premier: 
Katrin Sjögren (Lib) 
Deputy Premier, Minister of Industry, Trade and Environment: 
Camilla Gunell (S) 
Minister for Finance: 
Mats Perämaa (Lib) 
Minister of Education and Culture: 
Tony Asumaa (Lib) 
Minister of Administration and EU-affairs: 
Nina Fellman (S) 
Minister of Health and Social Affairs: 
Wille Valve (M) 
Minister of Communications and Infrastructure: 
Mika Nordberg (M)

2011 to 2015 
Government member parties: Åland Social Democrats (S), Åland Centre Party (C), Non-aligned Coalition (Obs) and Moderate Coalition for Åland (M):

Premier: 
Camilla Gunell (S) 
Deputy Premier, Minister of Finance: 
Roger Nordlund (C) 
Minister of Education and Culture: 
Johan Ehn (M) 
Minister of Social Affairs and Environment: 
Carina Aaltonen (S) 
Minister of Administration and EU-affairs: 
Gun-Mari Lindholm (Obs) 
Minister of Industry and Trade: 
Fredrik Karlström (Obs) 
Minister of Communications and Infrastructure: 
Veronica Thörnroos (C)

2007 to 2011 
Government member parties: Liberals for Åland (Lib) and Åland Centre Party (C):

Premier: 
Viveka Eriksson (Lib) 
Deputy Premier, Minister of Education and Culture: 
Britt Lundberg (C) 
Minister for Finance: 
Mats Perämaa (Lib) 
Minister of Social Affairs and Environment: 
Katrin Sjögren (Lib) 
Minister of Administration and EU-affairs: 
Roger Eriksson (Lib) 
Minister of Industry and Trade: 
Jan-Erik Mattsson (C) 
Minister of Communications: 
Runar Karlsson (C) 2007 to 2009
Veronica Thörnroos (C) 2009 to 2011

2005 to 2007 
Government members 2005-2007, Åland Centre Party (C), Åland Conservatives (Fs), Åland Social Democrats (S):

Premier:
Mr. Roger Nordlund (C)
Deputy Premier, Minister of Industry and Trade:
Mr. Jörgen Strand (Fs)
Minister of Equality and EU Affairs:
Mrs. Britt Lundberg (C)
Minister of Social Affairs and Environment:
Mrs. Harriet Lindeman (Fs)
Minister of Education and Culture:
Mrs. Camilla Gunell (S)
Minister for Finance:
Mr. Lasse Wiklöf (S)
Minister of Communications:
Mr. Runar Karlsson (C)

2003 to 2004 
Government members 2003-2004, Åland Centre Party (C), Åland conservatives (Fs), Liberals for Åland (Lib), Non-aligned Coalition (Obs):

Premier:
Mr. Roger Nordlund (C)
Deputy Premier, Minister for Finance:
Mr. Jörgen Strand (Fs)
Minister of Social Affairs and Environment:
Mrs. Gun-Mari Lindholm (Obs)
Minister of Education and Culture:
Mr. Lars Selander (Lib)
Minister of Industry and Trade:
Mrs. Kerstin Alm (C)
Minister of Transportation and Police:
Mrs. Tuula Mattsson (Lib)

2001 to 2003 
Government members 2001-2003, Åland Centre Party (C), Liberals for Åland (Lib)

Premier: 
Mr. Roger Nordlund (C) 
Deputy Premier, Minister for Finance: 
Mr. Olof Erland (Lib) 
Minister of Social Affairs and Environment: 
Mr. Sune Eriksson (Lib) 
Minister of Education and Culture: 
Mrs. Gun Carlson (C) 
Minister of Industry and Trade: 
Mrs. Ritva Sarin-Grufberg (Lib) 
Minister of Transportation and Energy: 
Mr. Runar Karlsson (c)

1999 to 2001 
Government members 1999-2001, Åland Centre Party (C), Åland Conservatives (fs), Non-aligned Coalition (Obs):

Premier: 
Mr. Roger Nordlund (C) 
Deputy premier, Minister for Finance: 
Mr. Olof Salmén (Obs) 
Minister of Social Affairs and Environment: 
Mrs. Harriet Lindeman (Fs) 
Minister of Education and Culture: 
Mrs. Gun Carlson (C) 
Minister of Industry and Trade: 
Mr. Roger Jansson (Fs) 
Minister of Transportation and Energy: 
Mr. Runar Karlsson (C) 
Minister of Information Technology and Law Affairs: 
Mr. Danne Sundman (Obs)

See also 
Parliament of Åland
Government of Åland 1999–2003
Parliament of Finland
Åland State Provincial Office
Provinces of Finland
Ting

External links
 Ålands landskapsregering

Government of Åland
Politics of Åland
Aland